Die Hard: Year One is an eight-issue comic book limited series which serves as a prequel to the film Die Hard and was published by Boom! Studios and written by Howard Chaykin. There were 8 comic issues produced in the series between September 2009 and April 2010. Its story is set in 1976 and follows John McClane as a rookie cop in the NYPD.

Description

In other media
In September 2017, Len Wiseman stated that he was casting for a young version of John McClane for an origin film called John McClane, adapting the events of Die Hard: Year One.

In March 2018, writing duo Chad Hayes and Carey W. Hayes were enlisted by 20th Century Fox to re-write the screenplay after Bruce Willis refused to endorse the previous edition and its actor.
In July, producer Lorenzo di Bonaventura submitted an updated treatment titled McClane, further confirming that the storyline features elements of McClane's and Holly's characters in the 1970s, intermixed with their present-day counterparts. The following month, Wiseman stated that pre-production on the new film should start "...fairly soon, no dates" once the script has been completed. Tobey Maguire joined the production team late Summer. By December, di Bonaventura handed in yet another draft, this time without input from Willis. Production designer Carol Uraneck, who was hired that September, later left the project by the close of the year.

In February 2019, the production team made a revision to the writing, insinuating that the project, though supposedly moving forward, is on the studio's backburner, as evidenced by executives not even having read the script yet. Actress Mary Elizabeth Winstead said that she would be interested in returning as Lucy Gennero-McClane in a future installment, but later intimated doubt that, due to scheduling, if the film would ever get made.

Die Hard was removed from the Fox imprint through at least its 2021 slate, after Disney's acquisition and senior management shake-up, which saw the dismissal of its theatrical distribution executive, Chris Aronson. The production was later cancelled outright in August 2019 after further consideration by Disney. In lieu of the reorganization of both companies, the media giant is said to be rebooting development of McClane for streaming as a television series.

In March 2022 it was announced that Bruce Willis was retiring from acting following a diagnosis of aphasia  ending all production on any form of the prequel/sequel McClane.

See also
 List of comics based on films

References

External links

2009 comics debuts
2010 comics endings
Comics based on films
Comics by Howard Chaykin
Die Hard